Edward Ambrose Baber (April 23, 1793 – March 19, 1846) was a U.S. doctor and diplomat. He was the U.S. chargé d'affaires in Italy from 1841 to 1844.

Baber was born in Buckingham County, Virginia. As an adult, he lived in Macon, Georgia, where he had a medical practice. He married the former Mary Sweet in 1829; they had two sons and three daughters.

Baber died due to an accidental ingestion of cyanide. His remains are buried in Macon.

Baber's Macon home is a registered historic landmark and was formerly the home to the law firm of Chambless, Higdon, Richardson, Katz & Griggs, LLP which has now relocated.

Sources
 "Ambrose Baber" entry of the Baber family tree
 List of U.S. Chiefs of Mission to Italy

1793 births
1846 deaths
19th-century American diplomats
People from Buckingham County, Virginia
Physicians from Georgia (U.S. state)
Accidental deaths in Georgia (U.S. state)
Deaths by cyanide poisoning
People from Macon, Georgia